Forrest Lucas (born February 1942) is an American businessman, the founder of Lucas Oil.

Early life
Lucas was born in February 1942, in Ramsey, Indiana, where he grew up, the eldest of four children. His parents Raymond and Marie had a small farm in Elkinsville, where he and his three sisters lived in "rural deprivation".

He was educated to a high school level.

Career
Lucas bought his first truck when he was 19, and his first semi-trailer at 21. He got a job with Mayflower Transit. He built up a fleet of 13-14 trucks, and started freight brokerage. Following the deregulation of freight in 1980, he was the first to get a full licence to deliver freight in 48 states.

In 1988, he founded Lucas Oil. In 2018, he founded Forrest Films, a film production company.

Protect the Harvest

Lucas is a founder of Protect the Harvest, a nonprofit organization which opposes "the radical animal rights movement" and particularly the Humane Society of the United States, which it calls "a wealthy and successful attack group".

Personal life
His first wife "couldn't stand to save money ... she'd spend it as fast as I made it", and they divorced in 1969.

He has been married to Charlotte Lucas since 1982, and they have seven children.

References

1942 births
Living people
People from Harrison County, Indiana
Critics of animal rights
 Lucas, Forrest